Hydrogen iodide is a diatomic molecule and hydrogen halide. Aqueous solutions of HI are known as hydroiodic acid or hydriodic acid, a strong acid. Hydrogen iodide and hydroiodic acid are, however, different in that the former is a gas under standard conditions, whereas the other is an aqueous solution of the gas. They are interconvertible. HI is used in organic and inorganic synthesis as one of the primary sources of iodine and as a reducing agent.

Properties of hydrogen iodide
HI is a colorless gas that reacts with oxygen to give water and iodine. With moist air, HI gives a mist (or fumes) of hydroiodic acid. It is exceptionally soluble in water, giving hydroiodic acid. One liter of water will dissolve 425 liters of HI gas, the most concentrated solution having only four water molecules per molecule of HI.

Hydroiodic acid
Hydroiodic acid is not pure hydrogen iodide, but a mixture containing it. Commercial "concentrated" hydroiodic acid usually contains 48–57% HI by mass. The solution forms an azeotrope boiling at 127 °C with 57% HI, 43% water. The high acidity is caused by the dispersal of the ionic charge over the anion. The iodide ion radius is much larger than the other common halides, which results in the negative charge being dispersed over a large space. By contrast, a chloride ion is much smaller, meaning its negative charge is more concentrated, leading to a stronger interaction between the proton and the chloride ion. This weaker H+···I− interaction in HI facilitates dissociation of the proton from the anion and is the reason HI is the strongest acid of the hydrohalides.
HI(g) + (l) → (aq) + I−(aq) Ka ≈ 1010
HBr(g) + (l) → (aq) + Br−(aq) Ka ≈ 109
HCl(g) + (l) → (aq) + Cl−(aq) Ka ≈ 106

Synthesis 
The industrial preparation of HI involves the reaction of I2 with hydrazine, which also yields nitrogen gas:

2 I2 +  → 4 HI + 

When performed in water, the HI must be distilled.

HI can also be distilled from a solution of NaI or other alkali iodide in concentrated phosphoric acid (note that concentrated sulfuric acid will not work for acidifying iodides, as it will oxidize the iodide to elemental iodine).

Another way HI may be prepared is by bubbling hydrogen sulfide steam through an aqueous solution of iodine, forming hydroiodic acid (which is distilled) and elemental sulfur (this is filtered):

H2S + I2 → 2 HI + S

Additionally, HI can be prepared by simply combining H2 and I2:

H2 + I2 → 2 HI

This method is usually employed to generate high-purity samples.

For many years, this reaction was considered to involve a simple bimolecular reaction between molecules of H2 and I2. However, when a mixture of the gases is irradiated with the wavelength of light equal to the dissociation energy of I2, about 578 nm, the rate increases significantly. This supports a mechanism whereby I2 first dissociates into 2 iodine atoms, which each attach themselves to a side of an H2 molecule and break the :

{H2} + {I2} ->[\text{578 nm radiation}] {H2} + 2I -> I{\cdots}H{\cdots}H{\cdots}I -> 2HI

In the laboratory, another method involves hydrolysis of PI3, the iodine equivalent of PBr3. In this method, I2 reacts with phosphorus to create phosphorus triiodide, which then reacts with water to form HI and phosphorous acid:

3 I2 + 2 P + 6  → 2 PI3 + 6  → 6 HI + 2 H3PO3

Key reactions and applications
Solutions of hydrogen iodide are easily oxidized by air:
4 HI + O2 → 2  + 2 I2
HI + I2 ⇌ HI3

 is dark brown in color, which makes aged solutions of HI often appear dark brown.

Like HBr and HCl, HI adds to alkenes:
HI + H2C=CH2 → 

HI is also used in organic chemistry to convert primary alcohols into alkyl iodides. This reaction is an SN2 substitution, in which the iodide ion replaces the "activated" hydroxyl group (water):

HI is preferred over other hydrogen halides because the iodide ion is a much better nucleophile than bromide or chloride, so the reaction can take place at a reasonable rate without much heating. This reaction also occurs for secondary and tertiary alcohols, but substitution occurs via the SN1 pathway.

HI (or HBr) can also be used to cleave ethers into alkyl iodides and alcohols, in a reaction similar to the substitution of alcohols. This type of cleavage is significant because it can be used to convert a chemically stable and inert ether into more reactive species. In this example diethyl ether is split into ethanol and iodoethane:

The reaction is regioselective, as iodide tends to attack the less sterically hindered ether carbon. If an excess of HI is used, the alcohol formed in this reaction will be converted to a 2nd equivalent of alkyl iodide, as in the conversion of primary alcohols into alkyl iodides.

HI is subject to the same Markovnikov and anti-Markovnikov guidelines as HCl and HBr.

Although harsh by modern standards, HI was commonly employed as a reducing agent early on in the history of organic chemistry. Chemists in the 19th century attempted to prepare cyclohexane by HI reduction of benzene at high temperatures, but instead isolated the rearranged product, methylcyclopentane (see the article on cyclohexane). As first reported by Kiliani, hydroiodic acid reduction of sugars and other polyols results in the reductive cleavage of several or even all hydroxy groups, although often with poor yield and/or reproducibility. In the case of benzyl alcohols and alcohols with α-carbonyl groups, reduction by HI can provide synthetically useful yields of the corresponding hydrocarbon product (ROH + 2HI → RH +  + I2). This process can be made catalytic in HI using red phosphorus to reduce the formed I2.

See also
Hydroiodic acid

References

External links
International Chemical Safety Card 1326

Hydrogen compounds
Iodides
Mineral acids
Nonmetal halides
Diatomic molecules
Iodine compounds
Reducing agents